David Robert Thompson (born 10 February 1955) is a British academic nurse and psychologist. He is professor of nursing at Queen's University Belfast. He holds honorary and adjunct positions in the United Kingdom, China and Australia and is an editor of European Journal of Cardiovascular Nursing. He served as a panel member of the 2001 UK Research Assessment Exercise and as a sub panel member of the 2008 UK Research Assessment Exercise. He was the first nurse to be elected a member of the British Cardiac Society.

Education
Thompson is a Registered Nurse and holds a BSc in nursing from the CNAA, a PhD in psychology from Loughborough University, an MA in policy from Loughborough University, a Postgraduate Diploma in Medical Social Anthropology from Keele University, and an MBA from the University of Hull.

Professional life
Thompson's clinical area is cardiac nursing and his specialty is cardiac rehabilitation. He was the lead author of the first series of studies to examine circadian rhythms of chest pain in myocardial infarction. Between 1998-2001 Thompson was the only person ever to serve as Professor of Nursing Research at the United Kingdom Department of Health and Social Care.

Awards and recognition
Thompson holds fellowships of the Royal College of Nursing, the American Academy of Nursing the Cardiac Society of Australia and New Zealand, the European Society of Cardiology and the Florence Nightingale Foundation. He is an Associate Fellow of the British Psychological Society. Thompson is a Member of the Academia Europaea (2019).

Bibliography
Thompson has over 500 publications listed on Web of Science that have been cited more than 10,000 times, giving him an h-index of 48. His three most-cited articles are:

References

External links
Official website

1955 births
People from Bradford
English nurses
Nursing researchers
British psychologists
Alumni of Loughborough University
Academics of Queen's University Belfast
Living people
Members of Academia Europaea
Fellows of the Royal College of Nursing
British nurses